At the 1982 Commonwealth Games, the athletics events took place at the QE II Stadium in Brisbane, Australia from 3–9 October 1982. A total of 39 events were contested, 23 for men and 16 for women athletes.

Medal summary

Men

Women

Medal table

Participation

See also
1982 in athletics (track and field)

References
Commonwealth Games Medallists - Men GBR Athletics; Retrieved on 21 July 2010
Commonwealth Games Medallists - Women GBR Athletics; Retrieved on 21 July 2010

 
1982 Commonwealth Games events
1982
Commonwealth Games
1982 Commonwealth Games
1982 Commonwealth Games